The Taça de Portugal de Rugby is the major Portuguese national rugby union knock-out competition. It has occurred, almost on a yearly basis since 1959, and is organized by the Portuguese Rugby Federation.

Belenenses are the current holders.

Taça de Portugal finals

Performance by club

See also
 Rugby union in Portugal

References

External links
 Federação Portuguesa Rugby site

Rugby union competitions in Portugal
1959 establishments in Portugal